Democracy in the fictional future city of Mega-City One has been a significant recurring theme in the Judge Dredd comic strip in 2000 AD. In particular, a number of stories published since 1986 have addressed the issue of the Judges' dictatorial system of government, and efforts by the citizens to re-establish democracy. Besides being a notable story arc in itself, the "Democracy" stories also had wider repercussions which led directly to the events depicted in the story "Necropolis".

The stories include "America", which is regularly voted by fans in polls as the best Dredd story ever written, and is Dredd creator John Wagner's favourite Judge Dredd story. Editor David Bishop called it "the best Judge Dredd story ever written." The first Democracy story, "Letter From a Democrat", is co-writer Alan Grant's favourite Dredd story.

All of the stories in the "Democracy" arc were written by Wagner or under his direction.

Backstory
The Judge Dredd comic strip is mostly set in Mega-City One in the 22nd century, on the east coast of the former United States. When President Robert L. Booth started the Third World War in 2070 (see Atomic Wars), the Judges – until then no more than a police force with extraordinary powers – deposed Booth, overthrew the Constitution and seized control of all institutions of government. Disillusioned with the elected politicians who had caused so much destruction to their country, much of the American public supported this move at the time. For the next four decades America was a dictatorship. (Mega-City One and the other American mega-cities became sovereign city-states early during this period, and the US ceased to exist.) Although the Judges were initially popular, the citizens soon grew to resent their new leaders as much as they had the old, until activists began calling for a return to democratic government.

Although the events of 2070 were established early in the Judge Dredd strip (in 1978), the issue of the Justice Department's position in society was largely ignored for the first nine years of the strip's history. The only other references to the political relationship between the Judges and the citizens were the occasional brief appearances of the elected mayor of Mega-City One, who was shown to be subordinate to the unelected head of state: the Chief Judge. However, in 1986 and 1987 co-writers John Wagner and Alan Grant finally addressed this topic seriously in two stories set in 2108 and 2109. As Wagner later explained:

Grant recalls a more random genesis:

Early stories

"Letter From a Democrat": The martyrdom of Hester Hyman

A seven-page story in 2000 AD #460 called "Letter From a Democrat" (1986) was the first story to show readers what life under the oppressive rule of the Judges actually meant. David Bishop has since described it as "a crucial story − the politicising of Dredd." It also marked the beginning of a darker, more mature tone in the strip generally, and a tendency to show the character of Dredd in a harsher light than before. Although light-hearted and humorous stories still continued unabated, "Letter" was followed by several other stories in a similar vein, more and more illustrating Dredd's role as the agent of a fascist system. Only three weeks earlier the writers had introduced a new character, Judge Silver, as the new chief judge, who proved to be more hardline and right-wing than his predecessor (and who played a very significant role in the Democracy- and Necropolis-related stories which were to follow).

The story was told in the form of a letter from a wife and mother to her husband. The writer, Hester Hyman, had written the letter to explain why she had decided to sacrifice her life for the cause of democracy. While the text of the letter was shown in captions, the pictures first illustrated events described in the early part of the letter, and then showed the circumstances of her death at the hands of a squad of judges led by Judge Dredd.

The letter begins by describing how Hester and her family (who in the story represent all citizens) live in fear of the Judges, and have virtually no say over their lives. Even on a family picnic in the park they are threatened and intimidated by a judge when their young son accidentally throws a ball at him. Finally deciding that enough is enough, Hester reveals that she has decided to join a terrorist group and take over a television studio at gunpoint to announce their manifesto for reform to the whole city.

Surrounded by judges, the group refuses to surrender, reasoning that they will only be remembered if they are killed. Dredd duly obliges them. The story ends with Dredd's stern warning: "Democracy's not for the people". 

The story contained also the first appearance of the recurring comedy character Bishop Desmond Snodgrass in a cameo role.

The Democratic March

According to series artist John Higgins: "Letter From A Democrat actually moistened my eyes and, maybe because of that, John and Alan wrote Revolution for me to draw. For me this story is fully effective political satire."

Revolution, published a year later, told of how Hester Hyman's sacrifice had inspired millions to demonstrate for democracy. Political campaign groups, including Hester's husband Gort Hyman, organised a massive protest march through the streets which would end at the Grand Hall of Justice. Chief Judge Silver did not want to ban the "Democratic March" outright, as such overt action would only play into the Democrats' hands. Instead he ordered Dredd to undermine the March by covert action. When Dredd asked if his orders included breaking the law, Silver replied: "on this one you write the law." This moment was itself a turning point in the history of the strip, as a fundamental feature of Dredd's character had always been his utmost regard for, and obedience to, the law. His subsequent actions within the strip can be explained if Silver is regarded as invoking the fictional Security of the City Act, which had been mentioned in earlier stories and which allows judges to act outside the law if necessary to protect national security. Nevertheless, later stories would depict Dredd's profound regret for the actions he took to thwart the March, and his disillusionment with the Judge System would have very significant consequences for the strip.

Dredd used various "dirty tricks" to undermine the March. He blackmailed the organisers by fabricating evidence against them and threatening to leak it to the press. He told Gort Hyman that if he did not withdraw he would conscript his children into the Academy of Law to be trained as cadet judges (the Academy does not require parental consent). He arrested an elderly leader on a trumped-up charge and made him stand all night without sleep or food, before releasing him minutes before the March was due to start, so that he would collapse from exhaustion along the way, undermining morale. Dredd ordered Weather Control to produce rain to reduce attendance. By the time the March started, numbers were well below the expected turnout. Undercover judges planted as agitators in the crowd first undermined morale by defeatist talk, and then incited violence by throwing things at uniformed judges, giving Dredd the excuse he needed to send in riot squads to break up the March and make arrests. The organisers were sentenced to significant terms of incarceration. Yet publicly, the Judges appeared to have the moral high ground.

Connection to "Necropolis"

Departure of Alan Grant
Although no more Democracy stories were published for another three years, Judge Dredd continued to be portrayed more and more as an uncompromising fascist, to a large extent due to the influence of co-writer Alan Grant, who felt that "any attempt to soften Dredd destroys the character." However, John Wagner preferred a more human approach to Dredd's character, and their creative differences finally came to a head in the 26-part story "Oz" (which was not a Democracy story). Grant later explained:

Grant stopped writing Dredd stories when "Oz" ended in 1988 (in 2000 AD #570).

Now the strip's sole writer, Wagner was free to return to the Democracy theme, this time with a more sympathetic depiction of Dredd's character in which Dredd began to have misgivings about his role in suppressing the Democratic March. Dredd's qualms would become the catalyst to take the whole Judge Dredd strip in a new direction.

Wagner used the Democracy theme to add depth to a separate story arc that he had already begun to develop in two sequels to "Oz", which had introduced the character Judge Kraken. Tying together the hitherto unrelated Democracy and Kraken storylines in "Tale of the Dead Man" (1990), Wagner laid the foundations for another 26-part epic, "Necropolis", which in turn would reciprocate by changing the direction of the Democracy stories.

Interviewed in 2005, Grant observed: "I rather think that stories like "Dead Man" ... could never have been written by the two of us together."

"A Letter to Judge Dredd"

"A Letter to Judge Dredd" (1990) was a six-page story written in the same style as "Letter From a Democrat", which had begun the Democracy story arc four years earlier. Set in 2112, the story was written from the perspective of a schoolboy writing a letter to Dredd as part of a school project about the Judge System. Despite his youthful naivety, the boy identified a multitude of problems with the dysfunctional system that Dredd stands for. Dredd was no doubt already aware of these problems to some extent, but the letter succinctly and starkly listed them at a time when Dredd was already growing disillusioned with the system due to his feelings of guilt in respect of the dubious and underhand methods he had used to subdue the Democratic March in 2109. The boy also described a neighbour who had been struck on the head by a judge on the March, receiving permanent brain damage as a result, which caused him to have violent mood swings and hallucinations. On the way to post his letter, the boy was murdered by the neighbour during one of his violent episodes. Attending the crime scene, Dredd read the letter and felt indirectly responsible for the boy's death.

"A Letter to Judge Dredd" was a significant story in its own right, as it brought Dredd's doubts about his role to a head. But its main significance is as the prologue to the seven-part story which immediately followed, "Tale of the Dead Man."

"Tale of the Dead Man"

Kraken was a clone who shared Dredd's DNA. He had been created by rogue judge Morton Judd as part of a clone army to overthrow the judges and conquer Mega-City One (though not to restore democracy). Of the survivors, Kraken alone was spared and was rehabilitated at the Academy of Law, with a view to having him one day replace Dredd when Dredd finally retired or died. Having graduated from the Academy, Kraken was due to take his Final Assessment, the test which cadets take to prove they are fit to become a full judge. Dredd was assigned as Kraken's examiner.

In the course of the assessment (which takes the form of the cadet performing the role of a street judge with full powers), Kraken killed a group of Democracy terrorists who had taken hostages. Shortly afterwards Judge Morphy, Dredd's best friend and mentor (who had supervised Dredd on his own Final Assessment), was killed on a routine vehicle stop. Furious, Dredd almost murdered one of the perpetrators, pulling back at the last moment when Kraken urged him to control himself. Despite Kraken's impeccable performance, Dredd's unappealable decision was to fail him, believing that "a leopard can't change its spots. Not this one, anyway." At the moment of announcing his verdict, Dredd tendered his resignation and requested permission to take the Long Walk, leaving the city forever.

During his preparations to leave the city, Dredd released every prisoner still in custody from the Democratic March.

"Necropolis"

Dredd's resignation was a significant event in the build-up to "Necropolis" (besides being inherently momentous in its own right). Chief Judge Silver ordered a news blackout on Dredd's resignation and then faked Kraken's execution after reimposing sentence of death for Kraken's crimes in the service of Judd. Reviving Kraken in secret, Silver overturned Dredd's verdict on him and made him a full judge, but on the condition that he impersonated Dredd, so that nobody would know that Dredd had left. Silver believed that Dredd had become such a symbol of law and order to the citizens that news of his departure would provoke a crimewave.

Consequently, when the Sisters of Death arrived in Mega-City One, they found Kraken there instead of Dredd. Finding Kraken to be vulnerable to manipulation by their psychic powers, as he was still torn by latent subconscious loyalty to his late master Judd, they were able to use him as their agent to free Judge Death from captivity and begin their conquest of the city. Had Dredd not resigned, they might not have found their task so easy. Dredd eventually returned to the city and defeated them.

As a result of the Necropolis disaster, Dredd realised that running away from his problems was no answer to them, and he rejoined the force. This time he confronted his doubts about the Judge System head on.

Democracy Referendum

Dredd persuaded new chief judge McGruder to permit the citizens to vote in a referendum on whether democratic government should be restored, or the existing Judge System should be retained. McGruder agreed because the Judges had lost much of their credibility in failing to protect the citizens from the Dark Judges during Necropolis: since the Judges' argument in favour of their dictatorial rule rested largely on their allegedly unique ability to protect the city and preserve order (which the last elected government had conspicuously failed to do), the Democrats' calls for reform were consequently more compelling than ever. The Democracy Referendum was scheduled for 2113, and was not popular among the rank-and-file judges, or even the senior ranks, since almost everybody predicted that the unpopular Judges would lose the vote by a landslide. So much did the Referendum depend on Dredd's personal support that Judge Grice and other judges even tried to assassinate him to prevent the vote from going ahead.

Dredd himself had few doubts of the outcome. In an interview he pointed out that although there was room for reform, the basic idea of the Judge System was still for the best: "better the devil you know", as the interviewer summarised it. Dredd's ultimate argument was that the people had to decide whether, while being mugged, they would rather rely on him or on their elected representative.

In spite of Grice's efforts the vote was held as planned, and to the surprise of everyone except Dredd, the Democrats actually lost. Democratic government had not existed for over forty years, and most citizens could not remember it. Most did not even bother to vote at all, and of those who did, the majority decided to retain the status quo. A two-million-strong mass of democrats marched on the Grand Hall, believing this to be a fix, but Dredd was able to both convince Blondel Dupre that the result was accurate and break her will in front of the others, pressuring her to state in public "you are the law." Discredited and disheartened, mainstream support for democracy faded away.

After the Referendum
The Democracy storyline is generally regarded as having concluded with the Referendum story, which was published in 1991. However, although the main Democracy campaign had indeed ended, repercussions continued in the strip for years afterwards. This took three forms.

First, various circumstances originating in "Necropolis" eventually led to the resignation of Chief Judge McGruder, whose rule had been marked by an unprecedented concentration of political power in her own hands. Responding to concerns about the way Mega-City One was governed, new chief judge Volt instituted constitutional reforms in 2117 designed to restore a limited measure of democracy to Mega-City politics. The Justice Department still retained supreme overall control, but some say over decisions at the municipal level was delegated to a new elected mayor and City Council.

Secondly, a trilogy published in 2001–2003 featured an assassin known as "the Chief Judge's Man", who murdered leading democracy activists, allegedly on the orders of Chief Judge Hershey.

Thirdly, although mainstream public support for popular sovereignty had dissipated, there were still diehard extremist groups who were willing to fight for the abolition of the Judge System. The most notorious of these was terrorist group Total War.

Total War

Total War first appeared in the 1990 story "America" (before the Referendum story). Their methods involved assassinating judges in the street and other violent tactics. They attempted to blow up the Statue of Liberty, to draw attention to the fact that the concept of liberty had already been destroyed by the Judges. They failed to do so in that story, but succeeded later (which was referred to in "America II").

Total War has not been used often in the strip, but made a reappearance in two stories in 2004, including a 12-part story of the same name, set in 2126. In "Total War" the terrorists tried to blackmail the Judges into relinquishing power by detonating nuclear bombs in random locations around the city at regular intervals. Three bombs exploded, killing millions, before Dredd stopped them. The attempt was counter-productive, since the public was appalled at the enormous loss of life which was supposedly caused for their benefit, and any remaining mainstream support for democracy dwindled still further. Also, once Total War's leaders were apprehended, Dredd was able to identify its members by working from the top down, by arresting group leaders, then cell leaders, and finally foot soldiers. Any hope of restoring democratic government was most likely obliterated, but Total War would return in subsequent strips, first in the mutants storyline and then in Day of Chaos.

Dredd's crackdown on the terrorist group was used as an opportunity in the 2005 story "Caught in the Act", to satirise real-life anti-terrorist policies in Britain and America, such as incarceration without trial and withholding evidence from prisoners.

Reviews
"Tale of the Dead Man" has been reviewed as "A piece of super-lean storytelling from Wagner ... This story has everything. Action, emotion, pathos, humour. Great characterisation ... And it contains my all-time favourite action scene as Kraken takes out a gang of terrorists [while] unarmed and handcuffed! How cool is that?"

The Referendum was depicted in "Twilight's Last Gleaming" (1991), written by Garth Ennis. One reviewer credited this story with having "a brilliant understanding of society," while another described it as "One of the darkest
and most political of all Judge Dredd stories ... This is a chilling reminder of how we can easily lose our rights if we don’t stand up for them."

Political cartoonist and writer Martin Rowson wrote:

"Revolution", the story featuring the Democratic March, was reviewed as follows:

Bibliography

Main stories
 "Letter From a Democrat" (written by John Wagner and Alan Grant, with art by John Higgins, in 2000 AD #460, 1986)
 Death of Hester Hyman.
 "Revolution" (written by John Wagner and Alan Grant, with art by John Higgins, in 2000 AD #531–533, 1987)
 The Democratic March.
 "Politics" (Written by Alan Grant, with art by Jeff Anderson, in 2000 AD #656, 1989)
 Not described above. A democracy activist is kidnapped.
 "A Letter to Judge Dredd" (written by John Wagner, with art by Will Simpson, in 2000 AD #661, 1990)
 Prologue to "Tale of the Dead Man."
 "Tale of the Dead Man" (written by John Wagner, with art by Will Simpson and Jeff Anderson, in 2000 AD #662–668, 1990)
 Story sets scene for "Necropolis" (in #674–699).
 See also The Dead Man (Judge Dredd spin-off in #650–662).
 "Nightmares" (written by John Wagner, with art by Steve Dillon, in 2000 AD #702–706, 1990)
 Dredd makes the case for the Referendum on the future of the Judge System.
 "The Devil You Know" (written by John Wagner, with art by Jeff Anderson, in 2000 AD #750–753, 1991)
 Judges try to kill Dredd to prevent the Referendum.
 "Twilight's Last Gleaming" (written by Garth Ennis, with art by John Burns, in 2000 AD #754–756, 1991)
 Referendum takes place and result announced.

Later stories
 "The Decision" (written by John Wagner, with art by Andrew Currie, in 2000 AD #957, 1995)
 Chief judge announces limited political reforms.
 "Sleaze" (written by John Wagner, with art by John Burns, in Judge Dredd Megazine vol. 3 #40, 1998)
 Not described above, but features judges blackmailing the city council and mayor.
 "Origins" (written by John Wagner, with art by Carlos Ezquerra, in 2000 AD #1505–1519 and 1529–1535, 2006–07)
 Not described above, but tells in flashbacks how the Judges ended democracy in America in 2070.

Chief Judge's Man stories
All written by John Wagner.
 "Chief Judge’s Man" (with art by Will Simpson, in 2000 AD #1244–1247, 2001)
 "On The Chief Judge’s Service" (with art by  Colin MacNeil, in 2000 AD #1263–1266, 2001)
 "Revenge Of The Chief Judge’s Man" (with art by John Burns, in 2000 AD #1342–1349, 2003)

Total War stories
All written by John Wagner.
 "America" (with art by Colin MacNeil, in Judge Dredd Megazine vol. 1 #1–7, 1990–1991)
 "America: Fading of the Light" (with art by Colin MacNeil, in Judge Dredd Megazine vol. 3 #20–25, 1996)
 "Terror" (with art by Colin MacNeil, in 2000 AD #1392–1399, 2004)
 "Total War"  (with art by Henry Flint, in 2000 AD #1408–1419, 2004)
 "Caught in the Act" (with art by Phil Winslade and Len O’Grady, in 2000 AD #1450–1451, 2005)
 "Cadet" (with art by Colin MacNeil, in Judge Dredd Megazine #250–252, 2006)
 "Hot Night in 95" (with art by Staz Johnson, in Judge Dredd Megazine #307–308 and 310, 2011)
 "Terror Rising" (with art by Colin MacNeil, in Judge Dredd Megazine #365–367, 2015)

References

External links
 2000 AD profile of the Total War trade paperback
 2000 AD profile of the America trade paperback
 2000 AD profile of Judge Dredd 21 collecting early Democracy stories
 2000 AD profile of trade paperback collecting "A Letter to Judge Dredd" and "Tale of the Dead Man"
 2000 AD profile of Democracy Now! trade paperback collecting Referendum stories
 Review of Total War trade paperback

Judge Dredd storylines